Grand Designs Australia is an Australian observational series on The LifeStyle Channel. The series, which is a local adaptation of the British series of the same name, sees host Peter Maddison chronicle the construction of grand and unusual houses.

Series overview
{| class="wikitable" style="text-align: center;"
|-
! style="padding: 0 8px;" rowspan="2" colspan="2"| Season
! style="padding: 0 8px;" rowspan="2" colspan=2| Episodes
! style="padding: 0 8px;" colspan="2"| Originally aired
|-
! First aired
! Last aired
|-
| style="background-color:#FFD43F; width:8px;" |
|1
| colspan=2| 9
| 
| 
|-
| style="background-color:#FF5F5F; width:8px;" |
|2
| colspan=2| 10
| 
| 
|-
| style="background-color:#003DF3; width:8px;" |
|3
| colspan=2| 8
| 
| 
|-
| style="background-color:#04B404; width:8px;" |
|4
| colspan=2| 10
| 
| 
|-
| style="background-color:#FF31F9; width:8px;" |
|5
| colspan=2| 10
| 
| 
|-
| style="background-color:#70D0FF; width:8px;" |
|Specials
| colspan=2| 3
| 
| 
|-
| style="background-color:#800080; width:8px;" |
|6
| colspan=2| 7
| 
| 
|-
| style="background-color:#70D0FF; width:8px;" |
|Kevin McCloud's Top 10 GDA
| colspan=2| 1
| 
| 
|-
| style="background-color:#1000A0; width:8px;" |
|7
| colspan=2| 14
| 
| 
|-
| style="background-color:#B36C80; width:8px;" |
|8
| colspan=2| 10
| 
| 
|-
| style="background-color:#21661F; width:8px;" |
|9
| colspan=2| 8
| 
| 
|-
| rowspan=2 style="background-color:#FB6900; width:8px;" |
| rowspan=2| 10
| rowspan=2| 16
| 8
| 
| 
|-
| 8
| 
| 
|}

Episodes

Season 1 (2010)

Season 2 (2012)

Season 3 (2012)

Season 4 (2013)

Season 5 (2014)

Specials (2015)

Season 6 (2015)

Kevin McCloud's Top 10 Grand Designs Australia (2017)

Season 7 (2017–18)

Season 8 (2019)

Season 9 (2021)

Season 10 (2022-23)

Home media

References

Lists of Australian non-fiction television series episodes